Gyan Bhalla (born 22 April 1910, date of death unknown) was an Indian sprinter. He competed in the men's 400 metres at the 1936 Summer Olympics.

References

1910 births
Year of death missing
Athletes (track and field) at the 1936 Summer Olympics
Indian male sprinters
Indian male middle-distance runners
Olympic athletes of India
Athletes (track and field) at the 1934 British Empire Games
Commonwealth Games competitors for India
Place of birth missing